Mściwuje  is a village in the administrative district of Gmina Mały Płock, within Kolno County, Podlaskie Voivodeship, in north-eastern Poland.

The village has a population of 126.

History
According to archives, more than 4000 Jews from the villages of Maly Plock, Stawisk, Kolna and Lomza were shot in Msciwuje.

References

Villages in Kolno County